Mowden may refer to the following places in England:

Mowden, County Durham, a housing estate in Darlington
Mowden, Essex, a hamlet
Mowden Hall School, a school in Bywell, Northumberland